Faithless Hijabi is an association founded by Zara Kay in 2018 in Sydney (Australia). Faithless Hijabi is a storytelling platform that enables ex-Muslim and questioning Muslim women to share their stories of apostasy, doubt and freedom while also providing support to women ostracised or abused for leaving islam. While being a platform that creates safe spaces for women to express their dissent, Faithless Hijabi strives to take an active role in advocating for women's rights. FH is active on numerous social media in order to enable people to reach out for help. At present, the organisation primarily publishes stories and blogs in English, but has recently launched their Arabic social media pages. FH's mission is "Educate through stories," and "to empower an underrepresented group of women."

Bibliography 

 Kay, Z. (2021). The faithless Hijabi: Helping ex Muslim women be seen, heard, safe and free. The Australian Humanist, (142), 25–27. https://search.informit.org/doi/10.3316/informit.848284667661604

Reference 

Former Muslims organizations
Apostasy in Islam
Organizations established in 2018
Blogs critical of Islam
Anti-Islam sentiment in Australia